Kesavan s/o Subramaniam is a Malaysian politician of Indian origin from the People's Justice Party (PKR), a component party of Pakatan Harapan (PH) coalition. He currently is a Member of Parliament represents the parliamentary seat of Sungai Siput in Perak. He is also formerly the Member of the Perak State Legislative Assembly for Hutan Melintang for two terms from 2008 to 2018.

Controversy 
In May 2019, Kesavan was accused of sexual harassment by a woman who claimed to be his former aide in a police report she had lodged. However, Kesavan had denied the accusation and her allegation of being his former assistant. Kesavan had counter filed a police report against the woman and claimed it was her who had taken advantage of himself and had tried to disrupt his family instead. On 16 July, Indrani Ramasamy who was the alleged PKR Sungai Siput treasurer and parliamentary research officer, filed a defamation suit against Kesavan.

Election results

References

External links

Living people
Malaysian people of Indian descent
People's Justice Party (Malaysia) politicians
Members of the Dewan Rakyat
Members of the Perak State Legislative Assembly
University of Malaya alumni
21st-century Malaysian politicians
1975 births